Timjanik is a village in the municipality of Negotino, North Macedonia. It is located in the Povardarie wine-growing region.

Demographics
According to the statistics of Bulgarian ethnographer Vasil Kanchov from 1900 the settlement is recorded as "Tamjanik" and having 1250 inhabitants with 1150 being Muslim Bulgarians and 100 being Christian Bulgarians. On the 1927 ethnic map of Leonhard Schulze-Jena, the village is shown as a fully Muslim Bulgarian village.As of the 2021 census, Timjanik had 1,138 residents with the following ethnic composition:
Macedonians 1,077
Persons for whom data are taken from administrative sources 27
Serbs 17
Turks 13
Others 4

According to the 2002 census, the village had a total of 1,155 inhabitants. Ethnic groups in the village include:
Macedonians 1,096
Turks 9
Serbs 49
Others 1

References

Villages in Negotino Municipality